Simon Viklund (born Simon Wiklund, December 1, 1979) is a Swedish freelance video game composer, music producer, sound designer and game designer, who was first known for his work on the 2008 game Bionic Commando Rearmed, in which he was a creative director and composer. He is also known for his work on the Payday series as a composer and the voice of the character Bain.

In 2000, Viklund joined his friend Ulf Andersson's company, Grin, and worked on most of the company's games, which included Bionic Commando: Rearmed. Grin went bankrupt in 2009, leading Viklund, Ulf Andersson and his brother Bo to found Overkill Software. Viklund left Overkill in 2015 to become a freelancer. In 2016, he joined 10 Chambers Collective, another company founded by Ulf Andersson, while continuing his freelance projects.

Early life 
Simon Wiklund  was born in Stockholm on December 1, 1979. He began learning music through the violin as child, and later received classical piano lessons for about seven years. He also taught himself to play the guitar and bass guitar. As a teenager he sang in the local church choir, and was briefly a singer in a band established by his friends in high school. He studied arts in high school, but later became more interested in music. Wiklund began to write music in the late 90s with the help of a computer program called FastTracker 2. None of his music was released at the time, because he was personally unsatisfied with his creations.

Career

2000–2009: Grin and early freelance work 
Wiklund joined Grin in 2000 and acted as a composer and sound designer on most of the company's projects, starting with its first game, Ballistics. He later changed his surname to Viklund as people abroad often mispronounced his name, as 'W' and 'V' are pronounced similarly in Swedish. Viklund was also involved in developing the PC version of Tom Clancy's Ghost Recon Advanced Warfighter (2006) and its 2007 sequel, which were published by Ubisoft. He subsequently led the development of Bionic Commando Rearmed, a remake of the 1988 NES version commissioned by Capcom; Viklund also composed the game's soundtrack, which was praised for its faithful reimagining of the original 8-bit arrangements. Elements of Viklund's Bionic Commando Rearmed soundtrack were also incorporated into Bionic Commando (2009), which was mainly scored by Jamie Christopherson, with Viklund serving as sound designer. Aside from Grin's projects, he also worked on Triotech's Wasteland Racers 2071 (2006).

Viklund began work on Bionic Commando Rearmed 2 as its creative director in 2009, before Grin went bankrupt four months into its development. Development was transferred to Fatshark, and Viklund was hired as a creative advisor and composer. He was also commissioned by Capcom for Final Fight: Double Impact (2010) and Street Fighter III: 3rd Strike Online Edition (2011), for which he composed the music.

2009–2015: Overkill Software 
Viklund, along with the Andersson brothers and other Grin employees, founded Overkill Software in 2009. At Overkill, he served as the creative director and sound designer for the company's first game, Payday: The Heist, and also composed its soundtrack, drawing inspiration from the 1995 crime film Heat.  He also voiced Bain, the main narrator and contract broker in the game. Viklund would reprise his role as composer and the voice of Bain in Payday 2, released in 2013.

On August 18, 2015, Viklund left Overkill to focus on his personal and freelance music projects. However, he continued to voice Bain and produce music in Payday 2 as a freelancer.

2016–present: 10 Chambers Collective 
In 2016, Viklund co-founded a new company with Ulf Andersson, 10 Chambers Collective, while also continuing to work on his freelance projects. He also signed an exclusive songwriter agreement with BMG in the same year.  Viklund composed the soundtrack to Robonauts in 2017, and worked as a game designer, narrative director, and composer for 10 Chambers' first project, GTFO.

Musical style and influences 
Viklund's compositions are primarily based on elements of electronic music genres such as techno, big beat, electro-funk, or dubstep, but some have been based on rock, industrial music and rap. In 2008, Viklund's music was labelled by Swedish magazine Nöjesguiden as "chip house" music, while Viklund considered his music to be from a variety of inspirations, ultimately becoming "8-bit-inspired dance music". In an interview with VGMO, Viklund described the musical style of his tracks to be "a mix between the music I find suitable for the project in question, the music I enjoy, and the music I have the skills to produce." In Ballistics and Bandits: Phoenix Rising, he cited the Quake III soundtrack, Fatboy Slim, and The Chemical Brothers as inspirations for the rock, techno, big beat, and industrial sound. When it came to the soundtrack of Bionic Commando Rearmed, Viklund was influenced by groups such as The Crystal Method and Justice, inspirations that he says can be "[heard] ... clearly in the music".

The soundtrack of Payday 2 featured a wide variety of music, especially when it came to the music for the game's downloadable content. The trailer for "The Big Bank" DLC featured an opera piece composed by Viklund, with the lyrics being written in Swedish and translated to Italian to be performed by opera singers.

Composition 
The music for his first two projects, Ballistics and Bandits: Phoenix Rising, were made with FastTracker 2, while the tracks for Bionic Commando series and Payday: The Heist, were made with Jeskola Buzz. In 2013, for Payday 2, he moved on to using Ableton Live, supplemented with a Native Instruments Komplete keyboard and the reFX Nexus 2 Synthesizer plug-in.

Works

Video games

Discography 
Viklund has released several of his compositions as albums and singles, both independently and on behalf of Overkill Software:

Albums

Singles

References

External links 
 

1979 births
Musicians from Stockholm
Swedish male composers
Swedish video game designers
Living people
Video game composers
Sound designers